Tanaophysa is a genus of moths of the family Crambidae described by William Warren in 1892.

Species
Tanaophysa adornatalis Warren, 1892
Tanaophysa rufiscripta (Hampson, 1913)

References

Spilomelinae
Crambidae genera
Taxa named by William Warren (entomologist)